Ali Pir Vali Muman (also Romanized as ‘Ālī Pīr Vʿalī Mūman; also known as ‘Ālī Pīr) is a village in Qaleh-ye Khvajeh Rural District, in the Central District of Andika County, Khuzestan Province, Iran. At the 2006 census, its population was 156, in 29 families.

References 

Populated places in Andika County